Bert or BERT may refer to:

Persons, characters, or animals known as Bert
Bert (name), commonly an abbreviated forename and sometimes a surname
Bert, a character in the poem "Bert the Wombat" by The Wiggles; from their 1992 album Here Comes a Song
Bert (Sesame Street), fictional character on the TV series Sesame Street
Bert (horse), foaled 1934
Bert (Mary Poppins), a Cockney chimney sweep in the book series & Disney film Mary Poppins
Iron Bert (one half of the two yellow diesels 'Arry and Bert), also in Thomas and Friends

Places
Berd, Armenia, also known as Bert
Bert, Allier, a commune in the French  of Allier
Bert, West Virginia

Electronics & computing
Bit error rate test, a testing method for digital communication circuits
Bit error rate tester, a test equipment used for testing the bit error rate of digital communication circuits
HP Bert, a CPU in certain Hewlett-Packard programmable calculators
BERT (language model) (Bidirectional Encoder Representations from Transformers), a natural language processing technique

Entertainment & sports
Bert, a type of shot in Pickleball
Bert Diaries, Swedish children's novels, TV series and film
Bert (TV series), a Swedish TV series based on Bert Diaries
Q*bert, a game whose Macintosh versions were known as Bert

See also

Birt (disambiguation)
Burt (disambiguation)